Robbie Davies (10 December 1949 – 4 August 2017) was a British professional boxer.

Amateur career
Davies represented England in the light-middleweight division at the 1974 Commonwealth Games, winning a bronze medal.

He represented Great Britain in the men's light-middleweight event at the 1976 Summer Olympics, beating Wayne Devlin of Australia in his opening fight, before losing to Alfredo Lemus of Venezuela in the next round.

In 1977, Davies won the ABA middleweight title, after beating Mike Shone.

Professional career
Davies made his professional debut on 8 September 1977, at the Liverpool Stadium, beating Joe Hannaford.

Personal life
Davies died on 4 August 2017. He had been suffering from dementia. His son, Robbie Davies Jr., is also a professional boxer.

References

External links

1949 births
2017 deaths
British male boxers
Olympic boxers of Great Britain
Boxers at the 1976 Summer Olympics
Boxers at the 1974 British Commonwealth Games
Commonwealth Games bronze medallists for England
Commonwealth Games medallists in boxing
Sportspeople from Birkenhead
Light-middleweight boxers
Deaths from dementia
Medallists at the 1974 British Commonwealth Games